Wu Yanan (born August 1962) is a general (shangjiang) of the People's Liberation Army (PLA) who served as commander of the Central Theater Command, succeeding Lin Xiangyang in January 2022 to January 2023. In January 2023, he was transferred to the Central Military Commission Joint Operations Command Center. He is a representative of the 19th National Congress of the Chinese Communist Party.

Biography
Wu was born in Fuxin, Liaoning, in August 1962. After graduating from Fuxin High School in 1980, he enlisted in the People's Liberation Army in September of that same year. He joined the Chinese Communist Party (CCP) in September 1984. In July 2013, he was promoted to become deputy commander of the 16th Group Army, and held that office until March 2017, when he was promoted again to become commander of the 78th Group Army. In April 2020, he was commissioned as deputy commander of the Northern Theater Command and commander of its Northern Theater Command Ground Force. In January 2022, he rose to become commander of the Central Theater Command, succeeding Lin Xiangyang.

He was promoted to the rank of major general (shaojiang) in July 2014, lieutenant general (zhongjiang) in April 2020 and general (shangjiang) in January 2022.

References

1962 births
Living people
People from Fuxin
People's Liberation Army generals from Liaoning
People's Republic of China politicians from Liaoning
Chinese Communist Party politicians from Liaoning